The battles of Dovhenke were military engagements in the village of Dovhenke, 20 kilometers south of the city of Izium, between the Armed Forces of Ukraine and the Armed Forces of the Russian Federation during the Northeastern Ukraine offensive and Eastern Ukraine offensive of the battle of Donbas.

Background 

Dovhenke is a village on the border between Kharkiv and Donetsk Oblasts. On 24 February 2022, Russia invaded Ukraine, in a steep escalation of the Russo-Ukrainian War, which had begun in 2014. The invasion caused Europe's fastest-growing refugee crisis since World War II, with more than 6.5 million Ukrainians fleeing the country and a third of the population displaced. On 1 April, the Ukrainian military confirmed Izium was under Russian control. The following day, in an interview for Ukrinform, Izium's Deputy Mayor Volodymyr Matsokin claimed that 80% of the city's residential buildings had been destroyed and that there was no power, heating, or water in the city.

Battles

First Battle 

On 15 May, the Ukrainian military announced that Russia had launched a new assault to take the village.

On 6 June, according to the Ukrainian News Agency, Ukrainian soldiers repulsed a new attack on Dovhenke, with Russian forces withdrawing part of their units to Izium due to losses sustained. Around this time, Russian State Duma Deputy Alexander Borodai reportedly traveled to Dovhenke to take part in the assault on the village with the Donbas Volunteer Union.

Aftermath of the First Battle 

By 12 June, Ukraine reported the Russian army was conducting an assault from Dovhenke towards Mazanivka and Dolina, indicating the village had been captured by Russian forces.

As of 25 June, fighting continued near Dovhenke, but at the end of the month, Russian operations moved to the south of the village, with Russian troops attempting to advance from Dovhenke towards Mazanivka.

Second Battle 
On 5 August, presidential advisor Oleksiy Arestovych announced that the Ukrainian army had started a new counteroffensive near Izium against Russian forces and that fighting had started again in Dovhenke. The next day, there was heavy Russian bombardment in the area, including in Dovhenke; this continued on 7 August. On 8 August, Arestovych said that, according to some sources, Dovhenke had been recaptured by the Ukrainian Armed Forces and that Ukraine was successfully advancing towards Izium. A report published on that day by the Ministry of Defence of Russia said that Russian forces had destroyed seven drones in a group of various villages including Dovhenke. On 9 August, Arestovych said that "Dovhenke is already behind us, according to some data. We have moved them." That day, the General Staff of the Ukrainian Armed Forces reported that Dovhenke and several other villages were being attacked by Russian forces. Russian forces shelled Dovhenke and the villages around on 10 August. Fighting stagnated until September 6th, when a counteroffensive drove Russia from Dovhenke. It later pushed Russia from most of the Kharkiv oblast.

References 

Dovhenke
Dovhenke
April 2022 events in Ukraine
May 2022 events in Ukraine
June 2022 events in Ukraine
August 2022 events in Ukraine
History of Kharkiv Oblast